St Wilfrid's, Alford is the Church of England parish church in Alford, Lincolnshire, England. It is a Grade I listed building.

Background

The church is named after St Wilfrid and is the second church to be built on the site, the earlier being constructed of wood. The church was thought to have been built in 1350; but in the early 21st century, one corner of the building was found to date back to 1289. The tower was rebuilt between 1525 and 1535, and Sir Gilbert Scott led an extensive restoration of the building in 1867.

Included within the church are a 14th-century rood screen dividing the chancel from the nave, a Jacobean pulpit, traces of 16th-century glass within the stained glass windows, and a 17th-century tomb within the chancel.

Bells

St Wilfrid's has a peal of six bells, originally cast and hung for full circle bellringing by John Taylors & Co of Loughborough in 1934.

The first peal of 5,040 changes was rung in June 1935; since then there have been a further 38 peals. Bell ringers are drawn from a wide age range and work under the tutelage of a teacher. Since 1991 there have been 16 peals rung on the bells.

Bell ringing achievements
In 2008 six St Wilfrid's bell ringers entered the local striking competition and were placed second, allowing them to enter the lower level of the county competition in which they were runners-up. In 2009 the St Wilfrid's team competed and won the local striking competition held at SS Mary & Nicholas, Wrangle; they entered the higher level of the county competitions in September 2009. On 4 June 2011 the St Wilfrid's team competed and won the local six bell striking competition at Friskney. They entered the higher level of the county competitions in September 2011.

Churches within the Alford Group of Parishes
 St Wilfrid's Church, Alford 
 St Andrew's Church, Beesby
 Holy Trinity Church, Bilsby
 St Andrew's Church, Farlesthorpe 
 St Andrew's Church, Hannah cum Hagnaby 
 St Peter's Church, Markby
 St James’ Church, Rigsby
 St Margaret's Church, Saleby 
 All Saints' Church, Ulceby, East Lindsey
 St Margaret's Church, Well
 St Helena's Church, Willoughby, Lincolnshire

Weekly or regular activities held within the Alford Group of Parishes
Beavers (Children / Teenagers) 
Bell Ringing (All Ages) 
Boys' Brigade (Children / Teenagers)
Brownies (Children / Teenagers) 
Cubs (Children / Teenagers) 
Football Club (Children / Teenagers)
Girls' Brigade (Children / Teenagers)
Guides (Children / Teenagers)
Mother and Toddler Club (Mothers and Toddlers)
Model Aircraft Club (Children / Teenagers
Rainbows (Children / Teenagers)
Scouts (Children / Teenagers)
Sunday Bunch (Children / Teenagers)
Young Farmers (Children / Teenagers)
YP's (Children / Teenagers)

References

External sources
Alford Group Of Parishes

Church of England church buildings in Lincolnshire
Grade I listed churches in Lincolnshire
14th-century church buildings in England
Saint Wilfrid